Neend is a Pakistani drama film directed by Hassan Tariq in his directorial debut and released in 1959.

Based on a story and screenplay by Riaz Shahid, the films stars Noor Jehan, Neelo and Aslam Pervaiz with Nighat Sultana, Allauddin and Agha Talish in supporting roles. The music was done by Rashid Attre while Noor Jehan also sang two songs of the film.

Neend is one of the last films of Noor Jahan, after which she retired from acting. The film was a hit at the box office and was later remade by the director in 1977 as Begum Jaan. BBC Urdu included it in the best selected films of Pakistani cinema. It was screened by Lok Virsa Museum in August 2016, as a part of special feature films screening in the country.

Plot 

The story of the film starts from a school where a child is taken for admission. The man who brings the children there, starts telling a story to the Principal where a coal picker on the railway track becomes a mother to a child after falling for the lust of a flamboyant Seth. Seth refuses to take the baby and the baby's mother shoots Seth and goes to jail. Here the flashback ends and this is the kid who has come for school admission.

The principal of the school hears this story and admits the child to the school.

Cast 
 Noor Jehan
 Neelo
 Agha Talish
 Nighat Sultana
 Allauddin
 Aslam Pervaiz
 Yasmin
 Diljit Mirza
 Asad Jafri

Awards
Neend (1959 film) won 2 Nigar Awards for 'Best Music' and 'Best Script' in 1959.

References

External links 
 

Films scored by Rashid Attre
1959 films
1950s Urdu-language films
1959 directorial debut films
Pakistani drama films
Pakistani musical drama films
Nigar Award winners
Urdu-language Pakistani films